Hiram Thomas Hinkley (born May 31, 1960) is an American actor. He made his feature film debut in the comedy Back to the Beach (1987), and subsequently appeared in the Academy Award-winning short film Ray's Male Heterosexual Dance Hall (also 1987). The same year, he appeared as a lead character opposite Bill Maher in the short-lived Showtime series Hard Knocks.

Hinkley later had supporting roles in Men at Work (1990), the horror film Silent Night, Deadly Night 4: Initiation (also 1990), and the comedy The Little Vampire (2000).

Life and career
Hinkley was born Hiram Thomas Hinkley, Jr. on May 31, 1960, in El Centro, California. He attended Culver High School in Culver, Oregon.
 
Hinkley's on-screen career began in the 1980s, including television guest roles, and periodic regular turns on TV series, including the short-lived Showtime series Hard Knocks (1987), that also featured Bill Maher. Having appeared in the Academy Award-winning Ray's Male Heterosexual Dance Hall, he has also been known for his roles in such popular box office draws as The Cable Guy (1996), The Little Vampire (2000), Ocean's Thirteen (2007) and Leatherheads (2008).

He also made several appearances in the first season of the sitcom Mad About You as Jay Selby, the best friend of Paul Buchman (played by Paul Reiser). He also voiced Earl Grunewald on the animated series Life with Louie. In 1995, he co-starred in the short-lived Fox TV sitcom The Preston Episodes with David Alan Grier.

That same year, Hinkley married actress Tracey Needham. In 1999, Needham gave birth to their daughter.

As of 2010, Hinkley worked as a teacher, teaching theatre arts to children in Boulder, Colorado.

Filmography

Film

Television

Notes

References

External links 

 

1960 births
Living people
American male voice actors
American male film actors
Male actors from California
Male actors from Oregon
People from Jefferson County, Oregon